The Woodworth political family is a collection of American and Canadian politicians who descend directly from colonial settler Walter Woodworth. They rose to prominence in the 19th century, serving in several states, in the United States House of Representatives, the House of Commons of Canada, and included America's first Surgeon General. In the modern era, two United States Presidents claim lineage to Walter.

U.S. presidential cabinet level officeholders 
John Maynard Woodworth (R) - United States 1st Surgeon General: 1871-1879

U.S. House of Representatives
James H. Woodworth (R) - Illinois: 1855-1857 (also served as Mayor of Chicago)
Laurin D. Woodworth (R) - Ohio: 1873-1877
William W. Woodworth (D) - New York: 1845-1847

Canadian House of Commons
Douglas B. Woodworth (LC) - Kings: 1882-1887

U.S. state senators
Frederick A. Woodworth - California: 1857
Arthur W. Woodworth (R) - Vermont: 1880 (also served in the legislature)
Robert Woodworth - New York: 1792-1796 (also served as a Judge of the Court of Common Pleas and in the legislature)
Frederick L. Woodworth - Michigan: 1913-1916 (also served in the Michigan house of representatives)
Burrel Woodworth - Connecticut: 1833
Wilbur Fisk Woodworth (R) - Kansas: 1863-1864 (also served in Michigan as a Circuit Court Judge)
Dempster Woodworth - Wisconsin: 1895-1899

U.S. state representatives
Thomas B. Woodworth (R) - Michigan: 1877-1888
Albert Woodworth (R) - New Hampshire: 1893-1895 (also served as Mayor of Concord)
George W. Woodworth (D) - Vermont: 1880-1888
Erastus Woodworth - New York: 1824-1832
Samuel Woodworth - New York: 1811-1812
Amos Woodworth - New York: 1835
James S. Woodworth - Massachusetts
Alanson Woodworth - New York: 1846
Samuel Woodworth - New York: 1825
Augustus Woodworth - New York: 1858

Canadian provincial legislators
Joseph E. Woodworth (C) - Manitoba: 1883-1886

U.S. state supreme court justices 
John Woodworth - New York: 1819-1828 (also served in State Legislature and Senate, and as State Attorney General)

U.S. military officers 
Selim E. Woodworth - Commander, U.S. Navy (also served in California Senate)
Benjamin Woodworth - Captain, War of 1812 (also served as a Marshal, Sheriff, and Coroner for Wayne County, Michigan)
Abner Woodworth - Captain, War of 1812 (later a general)
Gershom Woodworth - Captain, French & Indian War and American Revolution
 General George Vanwyck Pope, known as Van Pope - Brigadier General, U.S. Army, Chief of Staff to Gen. Omar Bradley during the founding of the 82nd Airborne Division, Fort Bragg, North Carolina, during World War II; descendant of Chicago Mayor James H. Woodworth

Other
Stephen Elias Woodworth - Signed the Declaration of Sentiments

Notable consanguinity descendants
U.S. Senator from Connecticut Prescott Bush
U.S. President George H. W. Bush
U.S. President George W. Bush
Florida Governor Jeb Bush
Emory A. Chase, New York Supreme Court Justice: 1897-1920

References

 
Political families of the United States